Devils and Angels may refer to:

Arum maculatum, or devils and angels, plant species of the family Araceae
"Devils and Angels" (song), 2003 song by Toby Lightman
Devils & Angels (album),  2007 album by Mêlée

See also
Devil and Angel
Angels & Devils (disambiguation)